The Marmelos Zero Power Plant is a decommissioned hydroelectric power plant on the Paraibuna River in Juiz de Fora, Minas Gerais, Brazil. Inaugurated in 1889, plant was the first major hydroelectric power plant constructed in South America, specifically for public use. It was purchased by CEMIG in 1980 and now serves as a museum. The Marmelos IA and II downstream are still in operation and are serviced by the original dam.

History
Bernardo Mascarenhas (1846-1899) became a resident of Juiz de Fora and as an adult became interested in providing electricity for the city. In 1886, Mascarenhas and banker Francisco Batista de Oliveira received approval from the city to use the Marmelos Falls for electric production and they subsequently incorporated the Minas Electricity Company. In February 1889, construction on the power plant began and by August, it began to produce initial electricity. The plant was inaugurated on September 5, 1889.

At first, the power plant utilized two  generators which operated single-phase alternators at a frequency of 60 hertz. In the next year, the plant powered 180 light-bulbs. In the following years, a third generator was added to the plant and it powered over 700 light-bulbs and contributed to industrial and public use in the city. By 1896, the power plant was decommissioned as new and improved plants such as the Marmelos I, IA and II were built that could better utilize the Marmelos Falls.

In 1980, CEMIG purchased the power plant and renovated it. It became licensed as a museum in 1983 and as of 2000 it is maintained by Universidade Federal de Juiz de Fora under an agreement with CEMIG.

References

External links

Marmelos Zero Museum

Energy infrastructure completed in 1889
Former hydroelectric power stations
Museums in Minas Gerais
Dams in Minas Gerais
Hydroelectric power stations in Brazil
Technology museums
Science museums in Brazil